The table tennis competitions at the 2018 Mediterranean Games took place between 26 and 30 June at the Valls Joana Ballart Pavilion in Valls.

Athletes competed in 2 individual and 2 team events.

Medal summary

Medalists

Medal table

References

External links
2018 Mediterranean Games – Table tennis

Sports at the 2018 Mediterranean Games
2018
Mediterranean Games